Palimpsest is a novel by Catherynne M. Valente, published in March 2009.  It follows four separate characters as they discover and explore a mysterious city accessed only at night.

Summary
The novel follows four travelers: Oleg, a New York City locksmith; the beekeeper November; Ludovico, a binder of rare books; and a young Japanese woman named Sei. They have all lost something important in their life: a wife, lover, sister, or direction. They find themselves in Palimpsest after each spend a night with a stranger who has a tattooed map of a section of the city on their body.

During the course of the novel, November recalls a favorite book of hers as a child.  This book, which is only mentioned briefly in Palimpsest, was turned into a full-length novel in 2009.  Valente wrote The Girl Who Circumnavigated Fairyland in a Ship of Her Own Making as a crowd-funded project; in October 2009, she announced that it, as well as a sequel, had been picked up by Feiwel & Friends, an imprint of Macmillan Publishers.

Reception
Palimpsest won the 2009 Lambda Literary Award for LGBT SF/Fantasy/Horror  and was a finalist for the 2010 Hugo Award for Best Novel.

References

External links
  Official website
"Palimpsest" at The SF Site
"Palimpsest, by Catherynne M. Valente"  at Strange Horizons

2009 American novels
American fantasy novels
Novels by Catherynne M. Valente
Lambda Literary Award-winning works
Bantam Spectra books